Taja Čajko (born 27 July 1993) is a Slovenian female handball player for ŽRK Mlinotest Ajdovščina and the Slovenian national team.

She participated at the 2018 European Women's Handball Championship.

Achievements
Slovenian First League:
Bronze Medalist: 2016

References

1993 births
Living people
People from Trbovlje
Slovenian female handball players